William Richard LeFanu FSA (9 July 1904 – 1 April 1995) was an Irish librarian. He was the husband of composer Elizabeth Maconchy.

Life 
LeFanu was born in Ireland, the son of Thomas Philip Le Fanu and his wife Florence Sophia Mabel (née Sullivan). He was educated in England at Eton and King's College, Cambridge.

In 1930, he married the composer Elizabeth Maconchy (later Dame Elizabeth Maconchy); they had two daughters, Elizabeth Anna (known as Anna, born 1939) and Nicola LeFanu (born 1947).

LeFanu worked for almost forty years as librarian at the Royal College of Surgeons in London.

References

 
 Profile, ncbi.nlm.nih.gov; accessed 9 April 2016.

1904 births
1995 deaths
People educated at Eton College
Alumni of King's College, Cambridge
Fellows of the Society of Antiquaries of London
Irish people of French descent
Irish librarians
William